Tororo Thermal Power Station is a  heavy fuel oil-fired thermal power plant located in the town of Tororo in Tororo District in the Eastern Region of Uganda.

Location
The coordinates of the station are 0°38'14.0"N, 34°07'00.0"E (Latitude:0.637222; Longitude:34.116667).

Overview
The power station is owned and operated by Electro-Maxx Limited, a private energy provider in Uganda, who built the power plant at an estimated cost of US$60 million.  The plant uses heavy fuel oil (HFO), a byproduct of petroleum distillation.  The plant currently imports HFO but in the future, it will leverage the country's natural assets and obtain domestically produced HFO or crude oil. The initial power station was fully commissioned in September 2010.

Upgrade
In August 2012, Ugandan print media reported that the power station was in the process of upgrading the plant's capacity to 80 megawatts, at an estimated cost of US$60 million. The upgrade was expected to be complete by September 2012. In May 2017, the Uganda Ministry of Energy and Mineral Development gave the installed capacity at this power station at 89 megawatts. Upon commissioning of the plant, Electro-Maxx became the first indigenous independent power producer in Africa for power plants with capacity greater than 20 megawatts.

Operation
The power station resumed operations in February 2014 with consistent dispatch. During 2013, the plant was on standby, producing power only when needed, such as a maintenance issue at a hydropower station. The standby period in 2013 resulted from a temporary high supply versus demand for power following the commissioning of the 250 megawatt Bujagali Power Station. With only twelve percent electrification and large industrial growth, demand is rising consistently, which increases the power required from the station.

In 2019, the power supply agreement that Electro-Maxx has with Uganda Electricity Transmission Company Limited (UETCL), the national sole bulk purchaser, was amended to allow the relocation of up to 8 megawatts of generation capacity to Arua City, to mitigate dire electricity shortage there. As of January 2021, only 3.8 megawatts of generation capacity had been relocated.

See also

Tororo Solar Power Station
List of power stations in Uganda

References

External links
  Contributing elements to success of IPPs in sub-Saharan Africa
 Energy Firms Eye Uganda’s Crude Oil And Gas For Power
 Loadshedding Returns
 Uganda: Brave Energy Reforms And New Growth

Oil-fired power stations in Uganda
Tororo District
Eastern Region, Uganda